KXGT (98.3 FM, "Thunder 106.1 & 98.3") is a radio station broadcasting a classic country format. Licensed to Carrington, North Dakota, United States, the station serves the Jamestown area. The station is currently owned by Ingstad Family Media.

The station was assigned the KXGT call letters by the Federal Communications Commission on October 20, 2005.

History

98.3 FM signed on in 1996 with the KYNU call letters as the original home for "Big Dog Country".  In 2005, Big Dog Country moved to 95.5 FM as the oldies format was swapped to 98.3 as "Oldies 98.3".  In 2008, KXGT flipped to adult contemporary as "Sunny 98.3". On August 9, 2012, the station flipped to classic hits as "Ted FM". In February 2018 KXGT changed their format from classic hits to a simulcast of classic country formatted KQLX-FM 106.1 FM Lisbon.

References

External links 
KXGT website

Classic hits radio stations in the United States
XGT
Radio stations established in 1996
1996 establishments in North Dakota